Edward David Burt  (born 23 November 1978) is the Premier of Bermuda and leader of the Progressive Labour Party (PLP). Burt is Bermuda's youngest ever premier, having taken office at the age of 38.

Early life and career
His mother, Merlin, is from Jamaica, while his father, Gerald, is Bermudian. He is married to Kristin and has two children, Nia and Edward.

Burt attended the George Washington University in Washington, D.C., double majoring in finance and information systems and attaining a master's degree in information systems development. During his time at GW, he served as president of the George Washington University Student Association. He attained a Project Management Professional certification in 2009. He is also a licensed private pilot.

Political career
In October 2006, at the age of 28, Burt was made Chairman of the Progressive Labour Party, serving until October 2009. In 2010 he was appointed to the Senate of Bermuda, where he was given various portfolios including Junior Minister for Finance and Junior Minister of Environment, Planning and Infrastructure Strategy. In 2012, he was elected to represent the constituency of Pembroke West Central, and was re-elected with increased majorities in 2017 and 2020. Before becoming the Premier of Bermuda, Burt was Leader of the Opposition (Bermuda) from the 4 November 2016 to 18 July 2017.

See also
List of current heads of government in the United Kingdom and dependencies

References

External links 
  official site

Living people
Premiers of Bermuda
Leaders of the Opposition (Bermuda)
Progressive Labour Party (Bermuda) politicians
Ministers of the Environment of Bermuda
Finance Ministers of Bermuda
Infrastructure ministers of Bermuda
Planning ministers of Bermuda
Bermudian people of Jamaican descent
George Washington University alumni
1978 births